The Massachusetts Bay Transportation Authority Police (also known as the T Police or Transit Police and colloquially known as the "Subway Cops") is a police force which has primary jurisdiction on Massachusetts Bay Transportation Authority (MBTA) property and vehicles in each of the 175 cities and towns within the MBTA. The department has grown to an authorized strength of 266 officers and 10 civilians. The majority of the MBTA Police Department's efforts are focused on patrol in Boston and surrounding communities. The department patrols and protects the 5 subway lines to include the Silver Line, 13 commuter rail lines, 4 passenger ferry routes, 181 bus routes and The Ride paratransit system in Massachusetts communities.

The agency is currently led by Chief Kenneth Green. His predecessor was Chief Paul MacMillan who was initially appointed acting chief in 2007 by then MBTA General Manager Daniel Grabauskas to replace Joseph C. Carter who left the job to accept the position of Adjutant General (TAG) of the Massachusetts National Guard. In 2008, Grabauskas permanently appointed MacMillan chief of the agency. MacMillan is the first agency chief appointed from within the ranks of the organization.

History
In October 1968, legislation was passed (Chapter 664 of the Acts of 1968, amended by Chapter 829 of the Acts of 1970 and Chapter 329 of the Acts of 1993) which created the MBTA Police Department (hereafter referred to as the MBTA Transit Police Department or the MBTA Transit Police) under the provisions of Massachusetts General Law (M.G.L.), Chapter 31.  The first full-time MBTA Transit Police Officers were hired on December 9, 1968. Chapter 664 of the Acts of 1968 (amended by Chapter 829 of the Acts of 1970 and Chapter 329 of the Acts of 1993):
established a Police Department under the supervision of a Police Officer to be known as a Chief of Police; provided that all Police Officers except for the positions of the Chief, Superintendent or Major would be subject to Chapter 31; provided that all Police Officers would have, within the territorial limits of the authority, the powers and duties conferred or imposed upon Police Officers of cities and towns by Massachusetts General Law, Chapter 41, Section 98; provided MBTA Transit Police Officers additional powers of Railway Police Officers under Massachusetts General Law, Chapter 159, Section 93; and provided that MBTA Transit Police Officers have the same authority on city or town property as they have on MBTA property.
Therefore, MBTA Transit Police Officers have full police powers within the territorial limits of the Authority.

After a rash of indecent sexual assaults on the Green Line in 2007 and 2008, detectives from the Criminal investigations Section began riding Green Line trains in plain clothes. Female detectives posed as patrons and had success in catching sex offenders in the act.

Possible merger
As of August 5, 2006, the local media reported the MBTA Police could merge with the Massachusetts State Police due to budgetary and staffing concerns. The union which represents the MBTA Transit Police supports this plan citing the difficulty the 257-member force has providing security for a transit system that spans 175 cities and towns in the state.  They also cite a rider to officer ratio of 5,058 passengers per transit officer, far greater than the national average of 1,759 passengers per transit officer.  The union reasons that after a merger, the existing MBTA officers could form a new State Police troop concentrating on providing security for inner-city Boston subway and bus systems, while state police officers could concentrate on commuter rail stations, T parking and MBTA routes outside of the city.  The merger would have an effect on pay scales as the state police force has a base salary $24,000 greater than the $48,000 base salary of a Transit Police officer. The union representing state police officers opposes the merger citing different training methods and selection processes for officers and extra competition for promotion opportunities.

Because of the projected cost of the merger (estimated at $11 million), the merger seems unlikely, at best.

Jurisdiction
The MBTA Transit Police Department has jurisdiction and full police authority in all of the 176 cities and towns that comprise the MBTA service area.  Outside the 176 cities and towns, the Transit Police exercises street railway police powers on the vehicles, properties and rights of way that comprise the Commuter Rail System.   The Transit Police promotes safety and security throughout Greater Boston and eastern Massachusetts, working with federal, state and local law enforcement agencies.  The MBTA Transit Police Department provides police services to patrons and employees of the Authority on MBTA property and vehicles.

Enforcement of transit-related laws off MBTA property, such as writing parking tickets at bus stops, is shared with municipal police departments, and the Massachusetts State Police on Massport and DCR property.

See also
List of law enforcement agencies in Massachusetts

References

External links
 MBTA Police

Transit police departments of the United States
Specialist police departments of Massachusetts
1968 establishments in Massachusetts